The 2007–08 Ohio Bobcats men's basketball team represented Ohio University in the college basketball season of 2007–08. The team was coached by Tim O'Shea and played their home games at the Convocation Center. They finished the season 20–13 and 9–7 in MAC play to finish tied for third in the MAC East. After the season O'Shea left Ohio for a position at his alma-mater.

Roster

Coaching staff

Preseason
The preseason poll was announced by the league office on October 18, 2007.  Ohio was picked third in the MAC East.

Preseason men's basketball poll
(First place votes in parenthesis)

East Division
 Kent State (10) 147
  (9) 146
 Ohio (8) 131
  (5) 128
 Buffalo 52
 Bowling Green 47

West Division
 Western Michigan (23) 173
  (6) 144
  (3) 131
 Eastern Michigan 92
  58
 Ball State 53

Tournament champs
Kent State (7), Western Michigan (6), Ohio (5), Miami (5), Akron (4), Toledo (3), Bowling Green (1)

Preseason All-MAC

Source

Schedule and results
Source: 

|-
!colspan=9 style=| Regular Season

|-
|-
|-
|-
|-
|-
|-
|-
|-
|-
|-
|-
|-
|-
|-
|-
|-
|-
|-
|-
|-
|-
|-
|-
|-
|-
|-
|-
|-
|-
!colspan=9 style=| MAC Tournament

|-
!colspan=9 style=| CBI

|-
|-

Statistics

Team Statistics
Final 2007–108 Statistics

Source

Player statistics

Source

Awards and honors

All-MAC Awards

Source

References

Ohio Bobcats men's basketball seasons
Ohio
Ohio
Bob
Bob